The 1989 Gent–Wevelgem was the 51st edition of the Gent–Wevelgem cycle race and was held on 5 April 1989. The race started in Ghent and finished in Wevelgem. The race was won by Gerrit Solleveld of the Superconfex team.

General classification

References

Gent–Wevelgem
1989 in road cycling
1989 in Belgian sport
April 1989 sports events in Europe